The 1934 Limerick Senior Hurling Championship was the 40th staging of the Limerick Senior Hurling Championship since its establishment by the Limerick County Board.

Ahane were the defending champions.

Ahane won the championship after a 6-06 to 3-03 defeat of Kildimo in the final. It was their third championship title overall and their second title in succession.

Results

Final

References

Limerick Senior Hurling Championship
Limerick Senior Hurling Championship